This is a list of programs broadcast by Cartoon Network (Latin American TV channel).

Current programming
Original programming from Cartoon Network Studios

 Apple & Onion (May 1, 2018)
 Ben 10 (April 10, 2017)
 Clarence (August 4, 2014)
 Craig of the Creek (June 16, 2018)
 Evil Con Carne (January 2, 2004)
 Foster's Home for Imaginary Friends (September 2, 2004)
 The Grim Adventures of Billy & Mandy (August 24, 2003)
 Johnny Bravo (November 7, 1997)
 My Gym Partner's a Monkey (February 12, 2006)
 Steven Universe (April 7, 2014)
 Summer Camp Island
 Uncle Grandpa (January 2, 2014)
 We Baby Bears (January 2, 2022)
 We Bare Bears (August 24, 2015) 
 Winx Club (previous seasons 1-3) (September 2, 2005)

Original programming from Warner Bros. Animation

 Jellystone!
 Looney Tunes Cartoons
 Scooby-Doo and Guess Who? (November 7, 2019)
 Teen Titans Go! (September 2, 2013)
 Tom and Jerry in New York
 Unikitty! (February 12, 2018)

Original programming from Hanna-Barbera Studios Europe
 The Amazing World of Gumball (September 4, 2011)

Acquired programming

 Barbie: It Takes Two (May 16, 2022)
 Total DramaRama (May 10, 2019)

Local shows
These shows were produced in the countries covered by Cartoon Network Latin America.

 Another Week in Cartoon
 Any Malu Show (May 4, 2020) 
 Jorel's Brother (February 2, 2015)
 Juaco vs. Paco (June 7, 2021) (exclusive for Colombia and Venezuela)
 Monica's Gang Las Aventuras de Papelucho Ninjin (September 19, 2019)
 Oswaldo (October 11, 2017)
 The (Sur)real World of Any Malu (May 4, 2017)
 Turma da Mônica Jovem (November 7, 2019)
 Toontubers Villainous 

Cartoonito shows 

 Batwheels 
 Bugs Bunny Builders 
 Lucas the Spider Thomas & Friends: All Engines Go''

References

See also
 List of programs broadcast by Cartoonito (Latin America)
 List of programs broadcast by Discovery Kids (Latin America)

Cartoon Network
Cartoon_Network-related_lists